Nimrim, in Moab, is mentioned twice in scripture in the Tanakh and Bible, in Isaiah 15:6 and in Jeremiah 48:34. 

Little is known of Nimrim other than it was in Moab. It is mentioned in connection with several cities that were under Moabite control at that time (around 626BC - 586BC) such as Heshbon, Zoar and Horonaim. Scholars are not in agreement of whether Nimrim was a river, or a lake, or a city.

See also
Isaiah 15

Resources

Matthew Poole Commentary Vol. 2 page 629,

Further reading
Hannes Bezzel, Article "Nimrim" in WiBiLex 

Hebrew Bible places